Ahmed El Messaoudi (born 3 August 1995) is a professional footballer who plays as a defensive midfielder for Eredivisie club Emmen. Born in Belgium, he represents Morocco at international level.

Club career
On 22 June 2019, El Messaoudi was loaned out to Fortuna in the Eredivisie until the end of the 2018-19 season.

On 15 August 2019, El Messaoudi signed with Groningen on a 3-year contract from KV Mechelen for an undisclosed fee.

On 7 September 2021, he signed a three-year contract with Gaziantep in Turkey.

On 30 August 2022, El Messaoudi returned to the Netherlands and signed with Emmen for the season.

References

External links

1995 births
Living people
Footballers from Brussels
Association football defenders
Moroccan footballers
Morocco international footballers
El Messaoudi, Ahmed
El Messaoudi, Ahmed
El Messaoudi, Ahmed
Belgian sportspeople of Moroccan descent
El Messaoudi, Ahmed
El Messaoudi, Ahmed
Fortuna Sittard players
El Messaoudi, Ahmed
FC Groningen players
Gaziantep F.K. footballers
FC Emmen players
Eredivisie players
Süper Lig players
El Messaoudi, Ahmed
Moroccan expatriate footballers
Expatriate footballers in the Netherlands
Moroccan expatriate sportspeople in the Netherlands
Expatriate footballers in Turkey
Moroccan expatriate sportspeople in Turkey
Belgian expatriate sportspeople in the Netherlands
Belgian expatriate sportspeople in Turkey